Pleasant Moments is a Czech drama film directed by Věra Chytilová. It was released in 2006. The film was awarded Best Editing (Jiří Brožek) at the 2006 Czech Lion Awards.

Cast
 Jana Janeková - Hana
 Jana Krausová - Eva
 Bolek Polívka - Dub (as Boleslav Polívka)
 David Kraus - Pavel
 Igor Bareš - Karel
 Martin Hofmann - Petr
 Miroslav Hájek - Honzík
 Ivana Milbachová
 Jirí Ornest - Benda
 Katerina Irmanovová - Bendová
 Barbora Hrzánová - Sára (as Bára Hrzánová)

References

External links
 

2006 films
2006 drama films
Czech drama films
2000s Czech-language films
Films directed by Věra Chytilová
2000s Czech films